Petrovo is a rural locality (a village) in Nikolskoye Rural Settlement, Ustyuzhensky District, Vologda Oblast, Russia. The population was 62 as of 2002.

Geography 
Nikola is the nearest rural locality.

References 

Rural localities in Ustyuzhensky District